Windsor Dam was originally built to control flooding of Ladysmith, in KwaZulu-Natal by the Klip River, but silt buildup quickly reduced its efficiency.

The Qedusizi Dam further downstream in the Klip River was completed in 1997 to take over the task of flood management.

References

Dams in South Africa
Dams completed in 1949